Cronan may refer to:

Cronan (surname)
Saint Mo Chua of Balla, also known as Crónán (mac Bécáin)
Saint Crónán of Roscrea
Saint Cronan's Boys' National School
Temple Cronan in Ireland

See also
Kronan (disambiguation)